("The Truth") is an Italian newspaper published in Milan, Italy. The newspaper is conservative and right-wing populist in outlook and often offers Catholic-inspired views, albeit being somewhat critical of Pope Francis.

References

External links
 

2016 establishments in Italy
Conservatism in Italy
Daily newspapers published in Italy
Italian-language newspapers
Newspapers published in Milan
Publications established in 2016